Gardner, West Virginia may refer to:
Gardner, Greenbrier County, West Virginia, an unincorporated community in Greenbrier County
Gardner, Mercer County, West Virginia, an unincorporated community in Mercer County